Dave Hilton (born 3 April 1970 in Bristol, England) is an English-born former Scotland international rugby union player. He was capped 42 times for the Scotland national rugby union team. In his club career he played for Bath Rugby, Glasgow Warriors and Bristol. His position of choice is as a prop.

Rugby Union career

Professional career
During his club career, Hilton won the Heineken Cup for Bath in 1998, as well as league and domestic cup successes for the same club.

He left Bath and played for Glasgow in the Welsh-Scottish League and then the Celtic League.

After being capped for Scotland on residency criteria he continued to play for Glasgow until 2003 before then returning to the English West Country to play for Bristol, until his retirement in 2008.

International career

He gained his first cap for the Scotland against Canada on 21 January 1991 and his 42nd and final cap against South Africa on 16 November 2002. Hilton originally believed he qualified for Scotland as his grandfather was born there.

However, in 2000 - and after 41 caps for Scotland - Hilton discovered his grandfather's birth was registered in Bristol and not Edinburgh as he believed. Hilton stated that his grandfather was born 16 weeks before the Bristol registration but he could not prove whether or not his grandfather was born in Scotland. Without adequate documentation he did not qualify to play for Scotland under the international eligibility rules.

At around the same time it was discovered that Welsh internationals Shane Howarth and Brett Sinkinson were ineligible to play for Wales under the grandparent rules. The resulting scandal encompassing Hilton and the others was named Grannygate and was embarrassing for the players and Rugby Unions alike. However both the SRU and the WRU escaped without fines. As part of a subsequent TV investigation Hilton's great-grandfather was traced to Glasgow giving credence to Hilton's Scottish ancestry.

Hilton had already moved from Bath to Glasgow to play for Glasgow Caledonians, now Glasgow Warriors, a year before the scandal broke so he had already a period of residence in Scotland. He had then to complete another two years in order to qualify again for Scotland under the 3-year residency rule. After that period of residency Hilton played once more for Scotland in a victory over South Africa in 2002.

On Grannygate and the belated South Africa game Hilton was to explain: "I had a lot of friends in the game, even journalists, who knew I was honest and hard working on the pitch and that encouraged me to try to get another cap. It was natural, too, because I felt Scottish. I’d got two England U21 caps but it was just like playing for any other team and I thought 'this is not for me.' It took to 2002 until I was cleared to play for Scotland again and I won my 42nd cap against South Africa at Murrayfield.

After trying for two and a half years to get this goal it was given to me through an unfortunate injury to Mattie Stewart. I was not at my best but it was great that Scotland didn't turn their back on me and I was very determined to prove I should be there.

I played 15 minutes off the bench and the crowd reaction was brilliant. It was one of my favourite games for Scotland and the pride I had at helping us beat South Africa 21-6 for the first time in 33 years was unbelievable. I didn't win any more caps after that but it was all worth it."

Coaching career

In 2012 Hilton joined Moseley as forwards coach and occasional replacement prop, having previously been coach at Dings Crusaders. Dave also coaches Clifton RFC Under 14's, who in the 2016/17 season won the Gloucester County cup, The Nando's Cup, The Bristol Combination 7s Cup and were Finalists in the Bristol Combination Cup. Clifton later went on to win the Bristol Combination cup as well as another Nando’s cup and 3 more Bristol combination 7s cups. 

Dave now coaches Bristol Bears Women in the Tyrell's premier 15s completion.

References

1970 births
Living people
Bath Rugby players
Bristol Bears players
Moseley Rugby Football Club players
Scotland international rugby union players
Glasgow Warriors players
Rugby union players from Bristol
Sports scandals in Scotland
English rugby union coaches
English rugby union players